Scopula supina is a moth of the  family Geometridae. It is found in Ivory Coast, Malawi, Nigeria and Uganda.

References

Moths described in 1920
supina
Lepidoptera of Uganda
Lepidoptera of West Africa
Lepidoptera of Malawi
Moths of Sub-Saharan Africa